Coussapoa is a genus of flowering plants belonging to the family Urticaceae.

Its native range is Mexico, Central & Southern Tropical America.

Species:

Coussapoa angustifolia 
Coussapoa arachnoidea 
Coussapoa argentea 
Coussapoa asperifolia 
Coussapoa batavorum 
Coussapoa brevipes 
Coussapoa chocoensis 
Coussapoa cinnamomea 
Coussapoa cinnamomifolia 
Coussapoa contorta 
Coussapoa crassivenosa 
Coussapoa cupularis 
Coussapoa curranii 
Coussapoa darienensis 
Coussapoa david-smithii 
Coussapoa dolichandra 
Coussapoa duquei 
Coussapoa echinata 
Coussapoa ferruginea 
Coussapoa floccosa 
Coussapoa fulvescens 
Coussapoa glaberrima 
Coussapoa herthae 
Coussapoa jatun-sachensis 
Coussapoa latifolia 
Coussapoa leprieurii 
Coussapoa longipedunculata 
Coussapoa macerrima 
Coussapoa manuensis 
Coussapoa microcarpa 
Coussapoa microcephala 
Coussapoa nitida 
Coussapoa nymphaeifolia 
Coussapoa oligocephala 
Coussapoa orthoneura 
Coussapoa ovalifolia 
Coussapoa pachyphylla 
Coussapoa parviceps 
Coussapoa parvifolia 
Coussapoa peruviana 
Coussapoa purpusii 
Coussapoa scabra 
Coussapoa sprucei 
Coussapoa tessmannii 
Coussapoa tolimensis 
Coussapoa trinervia 
Coussapoa valaria 
Coussapoa vannifolia 
Coussapoa villosa 
Coussapoa viridifolia

References

Urticaceae
Urticaceae genera